Castello ducale Cantelmo (Italian for Cantelmo Ducal Castle)  is a  Middle Ages castle in Popoli, Province of Pescara (Abruzzo).

History

Architecture

References

External links

Ducale Cantelmo
Popoli